Atractomorpha crenulata, commonly known as the tobacco grasshopper, is a species of grasshopper in the subfamily Pyrgomorphinae, found in Asia.

Taxonomy
A. crenulata is a member of the genus Atractomorpha, which is part of family Pyrgomorphidae. Johan Christian Fabricius, in his 1793 book Supplementum Entomologiae Systematicae, recorded the species as Truxalis crenulatus; it was later designated A. crenulata crenulata by William Forsell Kirby in 1910. As such, A. crenulata is the type species of its genus, which was described by Henri Louis Frédéric de Saussure in 1862.

Three subspecies of A. crenulata are known.
 A. c. crenulata (Fabricius, 1793)
 Synonyms: A. c. consobrina, A. c. obscura, A. c. porrecta, A. c. scaber
 A. c. fumosa (Bolívar, 1905)
 A. c. prasina (Bolívar, 1905)

Description
A. crenulata is greenish in color, with well-developed tegmina and rosy wings. The grasshoppers' bodies are medium-sized, whereas their antennae are short.

Range and habitat
A. crenulata is distributed in Sri Lanka, Bangladesh, India, Myanmar, north-western Sumatra, and southern Vietnam. But can also be found in midwestern areas of North America,such as Nebraska, Kansas and others  Keith McE. Kevan argues that specimens of A. similis reported in the Lesser Sunda Islands are most likely specimens of A. crenulata.

References

Works cited

 
 

Pyrgomorphidae
Orthoptera of Asia
Taxa named by Johan Christian Fabricius
Insects described in 1793
Insect pests of millets